The 1965–66 Spartan League season was the 48th in the history of Spartan League. The league consisted of 18 teams.

League table

The division featured 18 teams, 16 from last season and 2 new teams:
 Banstead Athletic, from Surrey Senior League
 Leavesden Hospital, from Herts County League

References

1965–66
9